Richard de Weston was the member of Parliament for Coventry in 1295. With Anketil de Coleshull he is the first MP for the city whose name is known. He was a merchant and had been a bailiff.

References 

Members of the Parliament of England for Coventry
English MPs 1295
Bailiffs
Year of birth unknown
Year of death unknown
English merchants